Attune is the fifth studio album by Australian recording artist Lenka, released on 13 October 2017 by Skipalong Records. "Heal" and "Lucky" were released as the lead singles from Attune on 8 September 2017 and 11 August 2017 respectively. The album was a sleeper hit.

Singles
"Lucky" was chosen as the album's first promotional single, being released on 11 August 2017. Lenka stated on her website that she wrote the song after having her daughter last year and the song was inspired by feeling the love in a big way on her daughter. The song had a digital video and was first released on 23 December 2016. The video only covered partial lyrics of the song and featured Lenka singing and playing her guitar.

The album's second single, "Heal", was released on 8 September 2017. The song was written by Lenka and Sally Seltmann. 'The song is inspired by conflict in relationships and how to get through it,' said Lenka on her website. A music video was released on 13 September 2017 on her YouTube channel which featured her dancing with two dancers. The video was directed by Lenka while her husband James Gulliver Hancock directed the artwork.

Additional feature
Attune includes a paper-art diorama designed by James Gulliver Hancock which requires customers to make it by themselves. Lenka released a video on 4 October 2017 on her website showing people how to turn the Attune CD cover into a pop-up diorama.

Critical reception
The album failed to chart in any market, though Attune received positive reviews from some music critics. The album was previewed and commented by Rolling Stone Australia on 11 October 2017. Jonny Nail of Rolling Stone Australia said, 'Attune is a remarkable rabbit-warren of an album, sucking us in with its seemingly shallow light-pop accessibility and then keeping us captivated with the underlying darkness and thought-provoking themes that bubble to the surface with little warning throughout.' Lenka was complimented for her invigoration and significant messages of the songs in Attune.

Track listing

References

External links
 Lenka's official website

2017 albums
Lenka albums